The Korat supple skink or Koraten writhing skink (Lygosoma koratense) is a species of skink in the family Scincidae. It is endemic to Thailand.

It can live in many different environments, including montane evergreen rainforests and low limestone hills, and also intensively cultivated and degraded areas.

References 

Lygosoma
Reptiles of Thailand
Endemic fauna of Thailand
Reptiles described in 1917
Taxa named by Malcolm Arthur Smith
Taxonomy articles created by Polbot